studioMDA is a multidisciplinary design firm, based in New York and founded in 2002 by Markus Dochantschi. studioMDA has worked extensively across the United States (including: New York, New Jersey, Connecticut, Massachusetts, Ohio, Vermont, Alaska, Florida and California), and internationally in countries such as Sweden, Austria, Switzerland, Norway, Ireland, Germany, Peru, Chile, Cambodia, The Democratic Republic of Congo, Turkey and Malawi.

studioMDA's work includes high-end and affordable residential, cultural, commercial, institutional, mixed-use, and design competitions. Throughout the last twenty years, the studio has designed and built more than thirty art galleries and over two hundred art booths and exhibitions. Working extensively with renowned art collectors, artists and galleries studioMDA has created both innovative and provocative gallery and exhibition spaces.

studioMDA works at multiple scales, from product design to urban planning, and collaborates with a wide range of arts, engineers and construction professionals from the very beginning of each project. Within this context, the developed design language can become layered into micro and macro scales, balancing from the smallest detail to the urban fabric.
Currently, the office is expanding its portfolio with Nino Mier Gallery, Timothy Taylor Gallery, Lio Malca Gallery, a private art museum in Thailand, and the new Center for Advanced Mobility in Aachen, Germany.

Selected Projects

Completed

Cultural 
2022 Esther Schipper Gallery, Seoul, Korea
2022 Judith Whitney Godwin Foundation, New York
2022 Templon Gallery, New York
2022 Print Center New York, New York
2022 PPOW Gallery expansion, New York
2021 Harper's Gallery, New York
2021 George Adams Gallery, New York
2020 Luhring Augustine Gallery, New York
2020 PPOW Gallery, New York
2020 Phillips Headquarters, New York
2019 Andrew Kreps Gallery, New York, NY
2019 Faurschou Foundation, Brooklyn, NY
2018 High Line Nine, New York
2018 Kasmin Gallery (27th St), New York
2017 Anton Kern Gallery, New York
2017 Bortolami Gallery, NY
2016 Carpenters Workshop Gallery, New York
2016 Dirimart Gallery, Turkey
2016 Lisson Gallery, New York
2015 Paul Kasmin Gallery (297 10th Avenue), New York
2015 Richard Taittinger Gallery, New York
2014 Paul Kasmin Gallery Shop, New York
2014 Edward Tyler Nahem Fine Art, New York
2013 303 Gallery, New York
2013 Nahmad Contemporary, New York
2012 Collectorspace Istanbul Gallery, Turkey
2011 Paul Kasmin Gallery, New York
2008 David Nolan Gallery, New York

Residential 
2021 Waverly Avenue Residence, Brooklyn, New York
2021 Upper East Side Townhouse, New York
2020 Water's Edge Residence, New York
2020 Watertower Penthouse, New York
2020 Franklin St. Residences and Gallery, New York
2020 West Village Carriage House, New York
2018 East 78th Street Townhouse, New York
2018 Pool Pavilion, Bridgehampton, New York
2018 Southampton Residence, Long Island, New York
2018 Sagaponack Beach House II, Long Island, New York
2017 East 71st Street Townhouse, New York
2014 Sur Lago Residence, Tuxedo Park, New York
2014 UES Townhouse, New York
2014 Fort Greene Townhouse, Brooklyn, New York
2014 Fifth Avenue Penthouse, New York
2013 West Village Carriage House, New York
2013 137 Franklin Street, New York
2012 Detiger Loft, New York
2012 Sagaponack Barn, Sagaponack, New York
2009 Tuxedo Park Residence, New York
2009 Showtime House, New York
2008 Anchorage Residence, Alaska
2007 Stockholm Penthouse, Sweden
2007 740 Park Avenue, New York
2007 Noho Loft, New York, NY
2007 Greenwich Street Residence, New York
2007 Governor’s Road Residence, Bronxville
2007 Park Avenue Penthouse, New York,
2006 Maplewood Residence, New Jersey
2006 Chappaqua Residence, Chappaqua, New York
2006 Central Park West Residence, New York
2005 Chile Beach House, Chile
2005 Lima Beach House, Lima, Peru
2005 Bronxville Residence, Bronxville, New York

Institutional 
2022 Center for Advanced Mobility, Aachen, Germany

Commercial 
2022 Ping Pod Upper East Side, New York
2022 Ping Pod Astoria, New York
2022 Ping Pod, Philadelphia
2022 Harper's Books, New York
2021 Phillips Headquarters offices, New York
2020 West 13 St. Lobby, New York
2020 Ping Pod, New York
2019 House of Bumble, New York
2011 Exerblast, New York
2010 Gumulira Clinic, Malawi
2009 High Line Office, New York
2008 McIntosh Townhouse
2007 Audi Showroom, New York
2007 Tracy Anderson Dance Studio, New York
2005 WhatIF, New York.

Exhibitions 
2021 "Jean-Michel Basquiat", Nahmad Contemporary, New York
2021 "Picasso and the Process of Creation", Helly Nahmad Gallery, New York
2019 "Beverly Pepper Cor-Ten", Marlborough Contemporary, New York
2018 "TIME SPACE EXISTENCE", Palazzo Mora, Venice, Italy
2017 Les Lalanne, Paul Kasmin Gallery, New York
2016 Ed Ruscha's Ribbon Words, Edward Tyler Nahem Fine Art, New York
2016 Drawing Room, David Nolan Gallery, New York (curated and designed by studioMDA's founder, Markus Dochantschi)
2016 – 2017 IMPASSE RONSIN, Paul Kasmin Gallery, New York
2015 Max Ernst PARAMYTHS: SCULPTURE, 1934–1967, Paul Kasmin Gallery, New York
2015 Robert Motherwell, Works on paper 1951–1991, Paul Kasmin Gallery, New York 
2015 Mnemosyne, de Chirico and Antiquity, Helly Nahmad (New York art collector), New York
2014 Still Life, Nahmad Contemporary, New York
2014 Le Chant de La Grenouille The Surrealists in Conversation, Helly Nahmad (New York art collector), New York
2013 Brancusi in New York, Paul Kasmin Gallery, New York 
2011 National Arts Club Installation, New York
2011 Soutine-Bacon, Helly Nahmad (New York art collector), New York

Art Fairs 
Independent Art Fair Masterplan, New York (2022)

1-54 Contemporary African Art Fair Masterplan, New York

David Nolan Gallery, NY 
Art Basel (2005–2007, 2009–2019, 2022)
Art Basel Miami Beach (2005–2019, 2022) 
Frieze Art Fair, New York (2017)

Dirimart Gallery Istanbul
Art Basel Hong Kong (2016–2017)
Armory Show, NY (2017)
Art Basel (2018)
CI Istanbul (2016)

Helly Nahmad (New York art collector), NY
Art Basel (2010–2019, 2021-2022)
Art Basel Miami Beach (2007–2019, 2021-2022) 
FIAC /Foire Internationale d'Art Contemporain, Paris (2012,2016)
The European Fine Art Fair, NY (2011, 2017-2020, 2022)

Edward Tyler Nahem Fine Art
Abu Dhabi Art, Abu Dhabi (2011,2014)
Armory Show, NY (2011,2017)
Art Basel (2009–2019, 2021-2022)
Art Basel Hong Kong (2015,2016)
Art Basel Miami Beach (2010–2019, 2021-2022)
Frieze Art Fair, London (2012,2013)
The Seattle Art Fair, Seattle (2016) 
The European Fine Art Fair, NY (2017-2019, 2022)
FIAC /Foire Internationale d'Art Contemporain, Paris (2017)
ARCO, Madrid (2019, 2020)

Paul Kasmin Gallery, NY
Abu Dhabi Art, Abu Dhabi (2014) 
Armory Show, NY (2016-2018)
Art Basel (2012,2015–2021)
Art Basel Hong Kong (2014–2019)
Art Basel Miami Beach (2011,2013–2018,2021-2022)
American Art Dealer Association, NY (2015–2018) 
Art Stage Singapore, Singapore (2015)
EXPO Chicago, Chicago (2016, 2017) 
Frieze Art Fair, London (2011)
Frieze Art Fair, New York (2014–2016,2018,2019,2022)
The European Fine Art Fair, Maastricht (2014,2015) 
The European Fine Art Fair, NY (2014,2017,2018)
Zona Maco Arte Contemporaneo, Mexico (2015–2017)

Nahmad Contemporary, NY
FIAC /Foire Internationale d'Art Contemporain, Paris (2014-2019,2021)
Frieze Art Fair, London (2017,2019,2021)
Independent Art Fair (2022)
Paris+ Art Basel (2022)

Richard Taittinger, NY
Art Basel Miami Beach (2018)
Paris Photo (2018)
Armory Show, NY (2018,2019)
Art 1-54, New York (2019)

Malborough Gallery, NY
Art Basel (2019)
Art Basel Hong Kong (2018,2020)
Art Basel Miami Beach (2018)
Frieze Art Fair, London (2019)

Anton Kern, NY
Art Basel (2017-2022)
Art Basel Miami Beach (2017,2018,2020)
FIAC /Foire Internationale d'Art Contemporain, Paris (2018,2019)
Frieze Art Fair, New York (2018)

Van de Weghe, New York
The European Fine Art Fair, NY (2017)

Johyun Gallery, South Korea
Art Basel (2021)

Hammer Galleries, New York
Art Basel Miami Beach (2017)

Michael Rosenfeld Gallery, NY 
Art Basel Miami Beach (2011)

Fine Sound Group
Munich High End (2015)

Gary Nader Art Center, New York
Art Rio (2016)

Conceptual 
Phillips Headquarters, 2021, Hong Kong
Governors Island Climate Center, 2021, New York
FARROC, 2013, Queens, New York
Condominiums, 2013, Tanzania
Osnabrück Comprehensive School, 2011, Germany
ARC Competition, 2010, Colorado
Munich Olympics, 2010, Germany
Raising Malawi, 2009, Malawi
Tempelhof Competition, 2008, Berlin, Germany
Bam Tower, 2007, New York
Governors Island Biomass Park, 2006, New York City
Harbor Park Pavilion, 2005
Forsythe Dance Studio, 2004, Vermont
U2 Tower Competition, 2003, Dublin, Ireland

In Progress

Cultural 
 Nino Mier Gallery, New York
 Timothy Taylor Gallery, New York
 Lio Malca Gallery, New York

Commercial 
 Ping Pod Fort Lee, New York
 Ping Pod Lexington, New York

References

External links

Architecture firms based in New York City
Architecture firms of Germany